Coronado Bay is a body of water located on the southwestern Pacific coast of Costa Rica. The bay lies to the northwest of the Osa Peninsula.

References

Bays of Costa Rica